James A. Glisson (January 6, 1939 – fall 2021) was a chiropractor and state legislator in Florida.

Glisson was born in Jackson County, Florida. He attended Palmer College and earned a degree in chiropractic studies He served in the Florida House of Representatives for the 33rd district from 1968 to 1972, as a Republican. He was elected to the State Senate in 1973 and served the 11th district until 1978. In 1976, he changed his party affiliation from Republican to Democratic.

References

Living people
1939 births
Members of the Florida House of Representatives
Florida Democrats
Florida Republicans
Florida state senators
20th-century American politicians